Complete Clapton is a greatest hits collection by British rock musician Eric Clapton, released on 9 October 2007 to accompany Clapton's official autobiography.

Release
The two-disc collection was released on 9 October 2007 to accompany Eric Clapton's official autobiography, Clapton: The Autobiography, released that same year (see also 2007 in music). An exclusive edition sold through Barnes & Noble bookstores in the United States included a bonus compact disc with four additional tracks. As with The Rolling Stones' Forty Licks, each disc has been compiled by different record companies: disc one, virtually identical to The Cream of Clapton by Polydor, and disc two by Warner Bros. Records. Clapton helped to promote the album by being interviewed by Matt Lauer on the Today Show in 2007.

Commercial success
The compilation debuted at number 14 on the U.S. Billboard 200. It also peaked at number two on the British albums chart, compiled by the Official Charts Company.

Track listing
All songs are by Eric Clapton, except where noted.

Critical reception

AllMusic critic Stephen Thomas Erlewine quickly notes that this compilation "doesn't even attempt to cover as much ground as his landmark four-disc 1988 box set Crossroads", but also recalls Complete Clapton "covers the nearly 20 years that have elapsed since the release of Crossroads, a time frame which includes the blockbuster success of his 1992 Unplugged, its all-blues 1994 follow-up From the Cradle, and many soft adult contemporary hits from the late '90s". Erlewine rounds his review up by saying it: "turns Complete Clapton into a portrait of Clapton the classic rocker" and "pack[s] many surprises, but it does hit the obvious highlights well and serves as a good hits package for the casual and curious fan, and in that sense, it works as a good companion piece to Clapton's autobiography".

Chart positions

Weekly charts

Year-end charts

Certifications

References 

Eric Clapton compilation albums
2007 greatest hits albums
Reprise Records compilation albums